Madina-Wora  is a town and sub-prefecture in the Mali Prefecture in the Labé Region of northern Guinea. It is listed under Geocode 2608 and Hasc code GN.ML.MW. It is a Third-order administrative division.

References

Sub-prefectures of the Labé Region